Ullatti is a locality situated in Gällivare Municipality, Norrbotten County, Sweden. In 2010 it had 213 inhabitants.

References 

Populated places in Gällivare Municipality
Lapland (Sweden)
Populated places in Arctic Sweden